Harrison Cardoso de Oliveira (born 9 July 1992) is a Brazilian professional footballer who plays as a attacking midfielder.

Career
Harrison started his career with Campeonato Brasileiro Série A club Athletico Paranaense B. He was then loaned to several clubs to add minutes to play such as Cuiabá in the 2013 season and Joinville in the 2014 season. While playing for Joinville, Harrison appeared in 11 matches and managed to make 1 assist for his partner to score.

Harrison then released permanently to Atlético Metropolitano in the 2017 season.

While strengthening Clube Atletico Metropolitano for two seasons, he also had a loan at the Tombense for half a season.

Persita Tangerang
On 30 June 2021, Persita Tangerang manager I Nyoman Suryanthara announced a deal for Harrison to join Indonesian Liga 1 club Persita on a free transfer.

On 28 August, Harrison made his competitive debut by starting in a 1–2 win at Persipura Jayapura. and scored his first goal for Persita against Persipura in the 15th minute from the penalty at the Pakansari Stadium.
On 23 October 2021, Harrison scored a brace for Persita in 2021-22 Liga 1 match, earning them a 2–1 win over Persikabo 1973.

References

External links
 Harrison Cardoso at Soccerway

1992 births
Living people
Footballers from São Paulo (state)
Brazilian footballers
Brazilian expatriate footballers
Campeonato Brasileiro Série A players
Campeonato Brasileiro Série B players
Campeonato Brasileiro Série C players
Harrison Cardoso
Girabola players
Kuwait Premier League players
Liga 1 (Indonesia) players
Saudi Second Division players
Club Athletico Paranaense players
Cuiabá Esporte Clube players
Joinville Esporte Clube players
Clube Atlético Metropolitano players
Tombense Futebol Clube players
Harrison Cardoso
Atlético Petróleos de Luanda players
Harrison Cardoso
Harrison Cardoso
Kazma SC players
Persita Tangerang players
Qilwah FC players
Brazilian expatriate sportspeople in Thailand
Brazilian expatriate sportspeople in Angola
Brazilian expatriate sportspeople in Kuwait
Brazilian expatriate sportspeople in Indonesia
Brazilian expatriate sportspeople in Saudi Arabia
Expatriate footballers in Thailand
Expatriate footballers in Angola
Expatriate footballers in Kuwait
Expatriate footballers in Indonesia
Expatriate footballers in Saudi Arabia
Association football midfielders